Samserganj Assembly constituency is an assembly constituency in Murshidabad district in the Indian state of West Bengal.

Overview
As per orders of the Delimitation Commission, No. 56 Samserganj Assembly constituency covers Dhulian municipality and Bhasaipaikar, Bogdadnagar, Chachanda, Dogachhi, Napara, Nimtita, Pratapganj and Tinpukuria gram panchayats of Samserganj community development block.

Samserganj Assembly constituency is part of No. 8 Maldaha Dakshin (Lok Sabha constituency).

Members of Legislative Assembly

Election results

2021

2016

2011
In the 2011 election, Touab Ali of CPI(M) defeated his nearest rival Mousumi Begum of Congress,

References

Notes

Citations

Assembly constituencies of West Bengal
Politics of Murshidabad district